Arthur Ashe won in the final of the 1972 World Championship Tennis Winter Finals 6–2, 3–6, 6–3, 3–6, 7–6 against Robert Lutz.

Seeds
A champion seed is indicated in bold text while text in italics indicates the round in which that seed was eliminated.

  Arthur Ashe (champion)
  John Newcombe (quarterfinals)
  Mark Cox (quarterfinals)
  Tom Okker (semifinals)
  Marty Riessen (quarterfinals)
  Cliff Drysdale (semifinals)
  Robert Lutz (final)
  Nikola Pilić (quarterfinals)

Draw

References

Singles